Piperolactam A is a natural product alkaloid found in many plants and first isolated from roots of Piper longum (long pepper). As a group, such compounds are called aristolactams, and are related to aristolochic acid.

History
Piperolactam A was first reported in 1988 after isolation from an extract of Piper longum. Many closely related natural product alkaloids are known including aristolochic acid and its lactam derivatives. In some reports, piperolactam A is called aristolactam FI.

Synthesis

Biosynthesis

It has been suggested that piperolactam A and related compounds are biosynthesised from aporphine precursors.

Chemical synthesis
Aristolactams including piperolactam A have been the subject of chemical synthesis studies, which have been reviewed.

Natural occurrence
Piperolactam A and related compounds are found in Aristolochiaceae (birthwort), Annonaceae (custard apple), Piperaceae (pepper), and Saururaceae plant families.

References 

Lactams
Heterocyclic compounds with 4 rings
Catechol ethers
Phenanthrenes
Methoxy compounds
Hydroxyarenes